Jordan competed at the 1984 Summer Olympics in Los Angeles, United States. 13 competitors, 12 men and 1 woman, took part in 12 events in 3 sports.

Athletics

Men's 800 metres
 Muteb Alfawair 
 1:49

Men's 1,500 metres
 Muteb Alfawair 
 3:50

Men's 5,000 metres 
 Basil Kilani
 Heat — 15:20.58 (→ did not advance)

Men's 10,000 metres
 Basil Kilani
 Heat — 30:43.54 (→ did not advance, 37th place)

Men's Marathon
 Ismail Mahmoud
 Final — 2:33:30 (→ 64th place)

Men's 20 km Walk
 Amjad Tawalbeh
 Final — 1:49:35 (→ 38th and last place)

Women's 3.000 metres 
 Raida Abdallah 
 Heat — 10.48.00 (→ did not advance, 28th place)

Fencing

One male fencer represented Jordan in 1984.

Men's foil
 Ayman Jumean

Shooting

Open

References

External links
Official Olympic Reports

Nations at the 1984 Summer Olympics
1984
1984 in Jordanian sport